James Cox (born December 29, 1983 in Northridge, California) was a starting quarterback for the Colorado Buffaloes football team in 2005 and 2006.

Personal
He majored in communication at Colorado. He was a 2001-02 National Football Foundation and College Football Hall of Fame Scholar-Athlete Award recipient.

References

External links
 Official Biography at CUBuffs.com (prior to 2006 season)
 ESPN statistics
 CNN SI statistics
 CBS Sportsline statistics
 Yahoo! statistics
 NFL Draft Scout Information

Colorado Buffaloes football players
Living people
1983 births